Batavia Downs  is an airport in Batavia Downs.

See also
 List of airports in Queensland

References

Airports in Queensland